Basuthkar Jagadeeshwar Rao (AKA B. J. Rao) is currently the vice chancellor of University of Hyderabad, Telangana. Prior to this, he was a senior professor at the Department of Biological Sciences at TIFR, Mumbai and the head of Mechanism of Genome Dynamics and Cellular Adaptations Laboratory, TIFR. His areas of specializations are molecular basis of genome dynamics, computational biology of genomes and protein active sites, cellular physiology and metabolism, to which he made fundamental contributions.  Apart from his fundamental research in the domain of biology, he is also interested in dissemination of scientific knowledge and outreach activities.

Early life

Rao obtained his BSc from Nizam College and his MSc from Osmania University, Hyderabad. He then obtained PhD from Indian Institute of Sciences, Bangalore in the domain of Biochemistry. He then went on to do his post-doctoral work at Yale Medical School where he served as research scientist for about seven years. He then returned to India and started working at TIFR in various capacities, from being a reader to associate professor and a chairperson.

Research

He is primarily interested in: 
 Mechanisms Genome instability-Repairs & Spatial dynamics of Chromosomal Territories vis-à- vis Genome Repair. 
 Cellular signaling & Tissue homeostasis vis-à- vis Genome repair.
 Biophysics of genome repair. 
 Computational Biology: Computational Genomics of organellar genomes; Computational analyses of protein active site geometry, evolution and promiscuity rules.
 Cell Biology of Chlamydomonas reinhardtii (a green yeast): cellular adaptive responses, metabolic and circadian rhythmicity, metabolic plasticity regulation by in cell NMR.

Collaborations and genome dynamics Lab

. 
.

Rao and his collaborators of Genome Dynamics Lab are interested in mapping and understanding the promiscuity scores of protein active sites with the help of computational approaches. They are also dissecting the biochemical mechanism of regulation of homologous recombination by tumour suppressors such as P53 and BRCA2 proteins.

Other activities include: 
 Chromosome territory movements associated with DNA damage response events in mammalian cells; Circadian control of UV-sensitivity in Chlamydomonas reinhardii
 Cell biology and metabolism in Chlamydomonas reinhardtii during adaptive stress responses.
The Lab is also involved in collaborative projects with chemists and physicists at TIFR to seek answers, for instance how “soft electrons” (≈10eV) intersect and change biomolecules etc., along with many other interdisciplinary research proposals.

Recognition and outreach

He is a Fellow of all three National Academies in India, and is also the Sir JC Bose Fellow of Department of Science & Technology, India. He is also  serving as a chief member and an advisor for various committees and has won many awards and fellowships.

He worked as a DST-inspire teacher by articulating the current excitements of basic biology to a large number of undergraduate students across India. He perceives biology as a complex manifestation of physics-chemistry of a dynamically evolving system and emphasize on design principles in Biology. He has given numerous technical as well as public lectures for varied audiences at conferences as well as at research centers.

Selected publications

References

Fellows of The National Academy of Sciences, India
Fellows of the Indian Academy of Sciences
Fellows of the Indian National Science Academy
1956 births
Living people
Osmania University alumni
Indian Institute of Science alumni
Yale University alumni
Academic staff of the University of Hyderabad
Scientists from Andhra Pradesh